Gaëlle Méchaly (born 15 June 1970 in Marseille, France) is a soprano. She is a frequent member of Les Arts Florissants and has appeared in a number of operatic productions of Baroque works directed by its founder, William Christie.

External links 
 
 2001 Cardiff Competition profile on Gaëlle Méchaly
 

1970 births
Living people
French operatic sopranos
21st-century French singers
21st-century French women singers